Thabang Stemmer (born 18 August 1979) is an ex South African international footballer who last played for Bloemfontein Celtic, as a goalkeeper.

Career
Stemmer has previously played club football with Orlando Pirates, Mabopane Young Masters, Black Leopards and SuperSport United.

Stemmer made his international debut for South Africa in 2005.

Stemmer was previously known as Thabang Radebe.

References

1979 births
Living people
South African soccer players
South Africa international soccer players
Sportspeople from Soweto
Orlando Pirates F.C. players
F.C. AK players
Black Leopards F.C. players
SuperSport United F.C. players
Bloemfontein Celtic F.C. players
2005 CONCACAF Gold Cup players
Association football goalkeepers